The Magistrates' Courts Act 1952 (15 & 16 Geo 6 & 1 Eliz c 55) was an Act of the Parliament of the United Kingdom which related to magistrates' courts. It was repealed by section 154 of, and Schedule 9 to, the Magistrates' Courts Act 1980.

Section 1
Section 1 did not apply to a committal for trial under section 1 of the Criminal Justice Act 1967

Section 24(1) of the Criminal Justice Act 1967 restricted the issue of a warrant under this section.

Section 1(2)(e) was inserted by section 56 of, and paragraph 34(2) of Schedule 8 to, the Courts Act 1971.

Section 1(4) was repealed by section 56 of, and Part IV of Schedule 11 to the Courts Act 1971.

Section 4
Section 4(2) provided that there was no obligation on examining justices to sit in open court. It was repealed by sections 6(2) and 103(2) of, and Part I of Schedule 7 to, the Criminal Justice Act 1967.

Section 9
Section 9(2) made special provision about offences dealt with by virtue of section 11 of the Criminal Justice Act 1925 outside the venue of the offence. Section 10(1) of, and paragraph 15(2) of Schedule 2 to, the Criminal Law Act 1967 provided that section 9(2) did not apply to offences committed outside England and Wales, whether within or without territorial waters.

Section 9 was repealed by section 56 of, and Part IV of Schedule 11 to the Courts Act 1971.

Section 10
This section was repealed by section 56 of, and Part IV of Schedule 11 to the Courts Act 1971.

Section 11
This section was repealed by section 56 of, and Part IV of Schedule 11 to the Courts Act 1971.

Section 12
This section was repealed by section 56 of, and Part IV of Schedule 11 to the Courts Act 1971.

Section 14
See sections 26(2) and 26(3) and 30 of the Criminal Justice Act 1967

Section 14(3) was amended by section 103(1) of, and paragraph 9 of Schedule 6 to, the Criminal Justice Act 1967.

Section 15
Section 24(2) of the Criminal Justice Act 1967 restricted the issue of a warrant under section 15(2).

Proviso (a) to section 15(2) was repealed by sections 24(2) and 103(2) of, and Part I of Schedule 7 to, the Criminal Justice Act 1967.

Section 18
See sections 3(3) and 18(2) and 35 of the Criminal Justice Act 1967.

This section was repealed by section 65(5) of, and Schedule 13 to, the Criminal Law Act 1977.

Section 19
See section 3(3) and 18(2) of the Criminal Justice Act 1967.

The words "tell him before what court he would be tried if tried by a jury and" in section 19(3) were repealed by section 56 of, and Part IV of Schedule 11 to the Courts Act 1971.

In section 19(4), the words from the beginning to the words "quarter sessions" where first occurring were repealed by section 10(2) of, and Part III of Schedule 3 to, the Criminal Law Act 1967. 

Section 19(4) was amended by section 56 of, and paragraph 34(1) of Schedule 8 to, the Courts Act 1971.

This section was repealed by section 65(5) of, and Schedule 13 to, the Criminal Law Act 1977.

Section 20
See section 3(3) of the Criminal Justice Act 1967.

Section 23
Section 23 related to the use in summary trials of evidence given in committal proceedings. It did not apply to any such statement as was mentioned in section 2 of the Criminal Justice Act 1967

Section 24
This section was repealed by section 65(5) of, and Schedule 13 to, the Criminal Law Act 1977.

Section 25
The words "tell him before what court he would be tried if tried by a jury and" in section 25(3) were repealed by section 56 of, and Part IV of Schedule 11 to the Courts Act 1971.

The words "triable by quarter sessions" in section 25(5)(b) were repealed by section 10(2) of, and Part III of Schedule 3 to, the Criminal Law Act 1967.

Section 25(5) was amended by section 56 of, and paragraph 34(1) of Schedule 8 to, the Courts Act 1971.

This section was repealed by section 65(5) of, and Schedule 13 to, the Criminal Law Act 1977.

Section 26
This section related to the remand of a defendant for medical examination and to the requirement of such an examination on committing a defendant for trial on bail.

The requirements of sections 18(1) and (2) of the Criminal Justice Act 1967 did not apply to the adjournment of a trial by a magistrates' court under section 26 of this Act, for the purpose of enabling a medical examination and report to be made on the defendant, if it appeared to the court that it would be impracticable to obtain such a report without remanding the defendant in custody.

From 1967, section 2(2) of the Costs in Criminal Cases Act 1952 (as substituted by section 32(1) of the Criminal Justice Act 1967) applied to a request to a registered medical practitioner to make a written or oral report on the medical condition of an offender or defendant, made by a court in exercise of the powers conferred on it by section 26 of this Act.

Section 26(1) was amended by section 103(1) of, and paragraph 10 of Schedule 6 to, the Criminal Justice Act 1967.

Section 28
This section related to committal for sentence.

See section 20 of the Criminal Justice Act 1967.

Section 56 of the Criminal Justice Act 1967 applied to this section.

Sections 28(1) and (4) were amended by section 103(1) of, and paragraph 11 of Schedule 6 to, the Criminal Justice Act 1967.

Section 28(1) was amended by section 56 of, and paragraph 34(1) of Schedule 8 to, the Courts Act 1971.

Section 29
This section related to committal for sentence.

See section 20 of the Criminal Justice Act 1967.

Section 56 of the Criminal Justice Act 1967 applied to this section.

And see section 62(7) of that Act.

Section 29 was amended by section 103(1) of, and paragraph 12 of Schedule 6 to, the Criminal Justice Act 1967.

Section 32
This section was repealed by section 65(5) of, and Schedule 13 to, the Criminal Law Act 1977.

Section 33
This section was repealed by section 33(3) of, and Part III of Schedule 3 to the Theft Act 1968.

Section 34
The words "of assize or quarter sessions" were repealed by section 56 of, and Part IV of Schedule 11 to the Courts Act 1971.

Section 40
This section provided for the taking of finger prints from a person who had attained the age of fourteen years and who had been taken into custody and charged with an offence.

From 1967, this section applied to any person of not less than fourteen who appeared before a magistrates' court in answer to a summons for any offence punishable with imprisonment.

From 1967, the references to finger prints in this section were construed as including a reference to palm prints.

Section 67
As to section 67(2), see section 47(6) of the Criminal Justice Act 1967.

Section 69
This section was repealed by sections 44(1) and 103(2) of, and Part I of Schedule 7 to, the Criminal Justice Act 1967.

Section 70
Section 70(1) was repealed by section 44(1) and 103(2) of, and Part I of Schedule 7 to, the Criminal Justice Act 1967.

Section 70(2) was amended by section 103(1) of, and paragraph 13 of Schedule 6 to, the Criminal Justice Act 1967.

Section 72A
The words "the Crown Court" were substituted for the words "a court of assize or quarter sessions" by section 56 of, and 

paragraph 34(3) of Schedule 8 to, the Courts Act 1971.

See section 48(1) of the Criminal Justice Act 1967.

Section 72A(2) was amended by section 103(1) of, and paragraph 14 of Schedule 6 to, the Criminal Justice Act 1967.

Section 72A(3) was amended by section 103(1) of, and paragraph 15 of Schedule 6 to, the Criminal Justice Act 1967.

Section 72B
The words "the Crown Court" were substituted for the words "a court of assize or quarter sessions" by section 56 of, and paragraph 34(3) of Schedule 8 to, the Courts Act 1971.

Section 72B(3) was inserted by section 103(1) of, and paragraph 16 of Schedule 6 to, the Criminal Justice Act 1967.

Section 74
See section 79(3) of the Criminal Justice Act 1967.

Section 83
Section 56 and Schedule 9 to the Courts Act 1971 substituted a reference to the Crown Court.

Section 84
This section was repealed by section 56 of, and Part IV of Schedule 11 to the Courts Act 1971.

Section 85
Section 85(1) was repealed by section 56 of, and paragraph 34(4)(a) of Schedule 8 to, and Part IV of Schedule 11 to the Courts Act 1971. It was superseded by the provisions of the Courts Act 1971 authorising the making of Crown Court rules.

Section 85(2A) was inserted by section 56 of, and paragraph 34(4)(b) of Schedule 8 to, the Courts Act 1971.

Section 86
This section was amended by section 56 of, and paragraph 34(1) of Schedule 8 to, the Courts Act 1971.

Section 89
This section was amended by section 56 of, paragraph 34(1) of Schedule 8 to, the Courts Act 1971.

Section 91
See section 74(11) of the Criminal Justice Act 1967.

Section 95
See section 18(4) of the Criminal Justice Act 1967.

Section 96
See section 47(8) of the Criminal Justice Act 1967.

Section 96(4) was amended by section 103(1) of, and paragraph 17 of Schedule 6 to, the Criminal Justice Act 1967.

Section 98
Sections 98(2) and (3) were amended by section 103(1) of, and paragraph 18 of Schedule 6 to, the Criminal Justice Act 1967.

Section 102
Section 102(3) was repealed by section 65(5) of, and Schedule 13 to, the Criminal Law Act 1977.

Section 104
See section 90(2) of the Criminal Justice Act 1967.

The proviso to this section was repealed by section 65(5) of, and Schedule 13 to, the Criminal Law Act 1977.

Section 110
Section 110(1) was amended by section 103(1) of, and paragraph 19 of Schedule 6 to, the Criminal Justice Act 1967.

Section 111
Section 111 was amended by section 103(1) of, and paragraph 20 of Schedule 6 to, the Criminal Justice Act 1967.

Section 113
Section 113(2) was repealed by section 103(2) of, and Part I of Schedule 7 to, the Criminal Justice Act 1967.

Section 114
Sections 114(1)(c) to (e) and 114(2) were repealed by section 103(2) of, and Part I of Schedule 7 to, the Criminal Justice Act 1967.

Section 122
The words "officers of the Crown Court" were substituted for the words "clerks of assize and clerks of the peace" by section 56 of, and paragraph 34(5) of Schedule 8 to, the Courts Act 1971.

Section 122(1)(c) was amended by section 56 of, and paragraph 34(1) of Schedule 8 to, the Courts Act 1971.

Section 125
This section was repealed by section 65(5) of, and Schedule 13 to, the Criminal Law Act 1977.

Section 126
Section 126(7) was repealed by section 10(2) of, and Part III of Schedule 3 to, the Criminal Law Act 1967.

The definition of "clerk of assize" in section 126(1) was repealed by section 56 of, and Part IV of Schedule 11 to the Courts Act 1971.

Section 127
Section 127(2) was repealed by section 65(5) of, and Schedule 13 to, the Criminal Law Act 1977.

Section 129
This section was repealed by section 56 of, and Part IV of Schedule 11 to the Courts Act 1971.

Schedule 1
See section 27 of the Criminal Justice Act 1967.

Entries numbers 1, 5 and 6 were repealed by section 33(3) of, and Part III of Schedule 3 to the Theft Act 1968.

Paragraph 8 was substituted by section 33 of, and Part III of Schedule 2 to, the Theft Act 1968.

The word "four" in paragraph 11 was repealed by section 10(2) of, and Part III of Schedule 3 to, the Criminal Law Act 1967, except in relation to offences committed before the commencement of that Act.

Paragraph 11 was substituted by section 29(2) of the Theft Act 1968.

Paragraph 15 was repealed by section 3(2) of, and Schedule 2 to, the Suicide Act 1961, except in respect to proceedings commenced before the commencement of that Act.

This Schedule was repealed by section 65(5) of, and Schedule 13 to, the Criminal Law Act 1977.

Schedule 2
Paragraph 6 was repealed by section 56 of, and Part IV of Schedule 11 to the Courts Act 1971.

The words "the trial by jury of certain summary offences" in paragraph 8 were repealed by section 65(5) of, and Schedule 13 to, the Criminal Law Act 1977.

Schedule 3
The table in paragraph 1 was substituted by section 93(1) of the Criminal Justice Act 1967.

Paragraph 3 was amended by section 93(2) of the Criminal Justice Act 1967. It was repealed by section 65(5) of, and Schedule 13 to, the Criminal Law Act 1977.

Schedule 4
The following headings, and all the entries therein, were repealed by section 103(2) of and Part I of Schedule 7 to the Criminal Justice Act 1967, that is to say:
"Committal for trial"
"Summary trial"
"Conviction"
"Examination"
"Extradition Act 1873 (36 & 37 Vict. c. 60) s. 5"
"Information" 
"Recognizance"

In the heading "Attendance", the words "or to take an examination elsewhere than in court" were repealed by section 103(2) of and Part I of Schedule 7 to the Criminal Justice Act 1967.

In the heading "Copy", the first two entries and the word "other" in the third entry were repealed by section 103(2) of and Part I of Schedule 7 to the Criminal Justice Act 1967.

In the heading "Order", the entry beginning "Order in case" were repealed by section 103(2) of and Part I of Schedule 7 to the Criminal Justice Act 1967.

In the heading "Summons", the words from "to include" to "time" were repealed by section 103(2) of and Part I of Schedule 7 to the Criminal Justice Act 1967.

In the heading "Warrant", in the entry beginning "To commit", the words "conviction or" in both places where they occur were repealed by section 103(2) of and Part I of Schedule 7 to the Criminal Justice Act 1967.

In the Note, the words "for re-swearing any person to any examination, or" were repealed by section 103(2) of and Part I of Schedule 7 to the Criminal Justice Act 1967.

Schedule 5
The words "clerk of assize, clerk of the peace or other" in the amendment of the Criminal Law Amendment Act 1867 were repealed by section 56 of, and Part IV of Schedule 11 to the Courts Act 1971.

The amendments of the Assizes Relief Act 1889, the Summary Jurisdiction (Appeals) Act 1933 and sections 20 and 29 of the Criminal Justice Act 1948 were repealed by section 56 of, and Part IV of Schedule 11 to the Courts Act 1971.

Part III
Sections 44(2) to (11) of the Criminal Justice Act 1967 had effect with respect to the issue of a warrant of commitment under this Part, for default in paying a sum adjudged to be paid by a conviction of a magistrates' court.

See also section 50 of the Criminal Justice Act 1967.

See also
Magistrates' Courts Act

References
Halsbury's Statutes. Third Edition. Volume 21. Page 181 et seq.
The Public General Acts and Church Assembly Measures of 1952. Printed by Henry George Gordon Welch, controller of HMSO and Queen's Printer of Acts of Parliament. 1952.

External links

United Kingdom Acts of Parliament 1952
Acts of the Parliament of the United Kingdom concerning England and Wales
1952 in England
1952 in Wales
Magistrates' courts in England and Wales